A list of the most notable films produced in the Cinema of Russia. Russia, since beginning to produce films in the late 1890s, has experienced three political regimes; the Russian Empire, Pre-1917; the Soviet Union, 1917–1991; and the Russian Federation, 1991–present. Films ordered by year and decade of release are split for political purposes.

Russian Empire (Pre-1917)

Soviet Union (1917–1991)

Russian Federation (1992–present)

1990s
 List of Russian films of 1992
 List of Russian films of 1993
 List of Russian films of 1994
 List of Russian films of 1995
 List of Russian films of 1996
 List of Russian films of 1997
 List of Russian films of 1998
 List of Russian films of 1999

2000s
 List of Russian films of 2000
 List of Russian films of 2001
 List of Russian films of 2002
 List of Russian films of 2003
 List of Russian films of 2004
 List of Russian films of 2005
 List of Russian films of 2006
 List of Russian films of 2007
 List of Russian films of 2008
 List of Russian films of 2009

2010s
 List of Russian films of 2010
 List of Russian films of 2011
 List of Russian films of 2012
 List of Russian films of 2013
 List of Russian films of 2014
 List of Russian films of 2015
 List of Russian films of 2016
 List of Russian films of 2017
 List of Russian films of 2018
 List of Russian films of 2019

2020s
 List of Russian films of 2020
 List of Russian films of 2021
 List of Russian films of 2022
 List of Russian films of 2023
 List of Russian films of 2024
 List of Russian films of 2025
 List of Russian films of 2026
 List of Russian films of 2027
 List of Russian films of 2028
 List of Russian films of 2029

In production
 Gofmaniada (Гофманиада)
 The Overcoat (Шинель)

External links
 Modern Russian movies at Russian Film Hub
 Russian film at the Internet Movie Database